Little Wood River is a  river in south-central Idaho in the United States. It is a tributary of the Malad River, which in turn is tributary to the Snake River and Columbia River.

Description
The Little Wood River originates in the Pioneer Mountains of northern Blaine County, then flows south through Little Wood Reservoir near Carey. Below the reservoir the river flows south into Lincoln County, past Richfield, and then west, past Shoshone, after which it enters Gooding County. Just west of Gooding, the Little Wood River joins the Big Wood River to form the Malad River.

Its tributaries include Baugh Creek.

The Little Wood River is the key source of irrigation water for eastern Blaine County and most of Lincoln County. Its water was a major attraction for the region's first permanent settlement at Carey. The river's water flow is regulated by reservoirs and affected by diversions of water into irrigation canals.

Variant names of the Little Wood River, according to the USGS, include McArthurs River and Wood River.

See also

 List of rivers of Idaho
 List of longest streams of Idaho

References

External links

Rivers of Idaho
Tributaries of the Snake River
Rivers of Blaine County, Idaho
Rivers of Lincoln County, Idaho
Rivers of Gooding County, Idaho